Jakub Krako (born	July 7, 1990) is a visually impaired alpine skier who competed for Slovakia at the 2010 Winter Paralympics. He won three gold medals and a silver medal at the 2010 Winter Paralympics.

References

External links 
 

Alpine skiers at the 2010 Winter Paralympics
Alpine skiers at the 2014 Winter Paralympics
Alpine skiers at the 2018 Winter Paralympics
Paralympic gold medalists for Slovakia
Paralympic silver medalists for Slovakia
1990 births
Living people
Medalists at the 2010 Winter Paralympics
Medalists at the 2014 Winter Paralympics
Medalists at the 2018 Winter Paralympics
Slovak male alpine skiers
Sportspeople from Žilina
Paralympic medalists in alpine skiing
Paralympic alpine skiers of Slovakia